Martin Gainor (March 27, 1915 – December 29, 1959) was a Canadian football player who played for the Winnipeg Blue Bombers. He won the Grey Cup with them in 1939. He is a member of the Blue Bombers Hall of Fame.

References

1915 births
1959 deaths
American players of Canadian football
North Dakota Fighting Hawks football players
Winnipeg Blue Bombers players
Players of American football from North Dakota
People from Sargent County, North Dakota